Wombwell Town F.C. was an English football club located in Wombwell, Barnsley, South Yorkshire.

History
The club was formed in the early 1890s and entered their first league in 1895 when joining the Sheffield Challenge Cup League, before moving onto the Sheffield Association League and entering the FA Cup for the first time in 1896.

They entered, and won, the Yorkshire League in the 1898–99 season before returning to the Association League. The club became defunct in the early 1900s.

League and cup history

Honours

League
Yorkshire League
Champions: 1898–99

Cup
None

Records
Best FA Cup performance: 2nd Qualifying Round, 1897–98, 1898–99, 1899–1900

References

Defunct football clubs in England
Defunct football clubs in South Yorkshire
Sheffield Association League
Yorkshire Football League